Draven may refer to:

 Jamie Draven (born 1979), actor
 Jojo Draven, musician and composer
 Eric Draven, fictional hero of James O'Barr's comic book The Crow
 Draven (band), English rock band
 Draven, a playable character in the video game League of Legends